= Bakaniya =

Bhyani
- village
- Location within Madhya Pradesh Location within India
- Coordinates: 23.267123°N 77.244025°E
- Country: India
- State: Madhya Pradesh
- District: Bhopal
- Tehsil: Huzur

Population (2011)
  - Total: 1,593
- Time zone: UTC+5:30 (IST)
- ISO 3166 code: MP-IN
- Census code: 482478

Bhiyani is a village in the Bhind District of Madhya Pradesh, India. It is located in the Gohad tehsil and the Phanda block. gohad Subdistric is located nearby.

== Demographics ==
According to the 2011 census of India, Bakaniya has 329 households. The effective literacy rate (i.e. the literacy rate of population excluding children aged 6 and below) is 75.29%.

Demographics (2011 Census)
	Total	Male	Female
Population	1593	817	776
Children aged below 6 years	221	104	117
Scheduled caste	245	121	124
Scheduled tribe	10	4	6
Literates	1033	623	410
Workers (all)	664	429	235
Main workers (total)	412	373	39
Main workers: Cultivators	156	147	9
Main workers: Agricultural labourers	159	134	25
Main workers: Household industry workers	1	1	0
Main workers: Other	96	91	5
Marginal workers (total)	252	56	196
Marginal workers: Cultivators	17	6	11
Marginal workers: Agricultural labourers	212	39	173
Marginal workers: Household industry workers	2	1	1
Marginal workers: Others	21	10	11
Non-workers	929	388	541
